André François-Poncet (13 June 1887 – 8 January 1978) was a French politician and diplomat whose post as ambassador to Germany allowed him to witness first-hand the rise to power of Adolf Hitler and the Nazi Party, and the Nazi regime's preparations for World War II.

François-Poncet was the son of a counselor of the Court of Appeals in Paris. A student of German studies at the Paris Institute of Political Studies, his first area of study was journalism. One of François-Poncet's early written works included observations made during several journeys to the German Empire in the years prior to World War I. During the war, he served as an infantry lieutenant.

Between 1917 and 1919, he was assigned to the press office of the French embassy in Bern, Switzerland and later served with the International Economic Mission in the United States and in other diplomatic roles under a series of French leaders.

François-Poncet became managing director of the Société d'études et d'informations économiques (Society for Economic Studies and Information). In 1924, he was replaced by Émile Mireaux.

He served as a delegate to the League of Nations, and in August 1931 was named undersecretary of state and ambassador to Weimar Germany. From his post in Berlin, François-Poncet witnessed the rise of Hitler and later observed signs of Germany's plans for World War II. The insightful François-Poncet was described by American journalist William Shirer in his The Rise and Fall of the Third Reich as "the best informed ambassador in Berlin", but the French government generally did not heed the ambassador's many warnings about Hitler's intentions. François-Poncet was inadvertently involved in the purge of the Night of the Long Knives when, in Hitler's justification for the killings, he referred to a dinner that François-Poncet had attended with Ernst Röhm and Kurt von Schleicher as evidence that the men had been conspiring with the French to overthrow the German government. As the evidence was manufactured, François-Poncet himself was never named or charged with anything.

Shortly after the Munich Agreement was signed in 1938, François-Poncet left his post as French ambassador to Germany
after a farewell visit to Hitler at the Eagle's Nest on 18 October 1938.
He was then reassigned to Rome as ambassador to Fascist Italy. He served in that position until 1940 when Italy declared war to France.

Arrested by the Gestapo during the wartime German occupation of France, François-Poncet was imprisoned for three years.

In 1949, he was named French high commissioner to West Germany, a position which was later elevated to ambassador. François-Poncet served in this capacity until 1955. He was later vice president and president of the French Red Cross. In 1952, he was elected to the Académie française, taking the seat previously occupied by Marshal Philippe Petain.

Occasionally contributing to the French newspaper Le Figaro, François-Poncet wrote numerous books, several based on his experience as French ambassador to Germany in the 1930s and reflecting his lifelong interest in Germany. At least one of his works, Souvenirs d'une ambassade à Berlin, published in France in 1946, was translated to English as The Fateful Years: Memoirs of a French Ambassador in Berlin, 1931–1938 in 1949.

André François-Poncet was the father of Jean François-Poncet, also a French politician and diplomat who served as Minister of Foreign Affairs under French President Valéry Giscard d'Estaing.

References

External links 

 Article on François-Poncet by the Académie française
 

1887 births
1978 deaths
People from Provins
Politicians from Île-de-France
Democratic Republican Alliance politicians
Democratic and Social Action politicians
Members of the 13th Chamber of Deputies of the French Third Republic
Members of the 14th Chamber of Deputies of the French Third Republic
Ambassadors of France to Germany
Ambassadors of France to West Germany
Ambassadors of France to Italy
20th-century French diplomats
French memoirists
French male non-fiction writers
Members of the Académie Française
French Army officers
Sciences Po alumni
French military personnel of World War I
World War II prisoners of war held by Germany
Grand Crosses 1st class of the Order of Merit of the Federal Republic of Germany
Burials at the Cemetery of Notre-Dame, Versailles
20th-century French journalists
20th-century memoirists
20th-century French male writers